Schizophrenia Bulletin is a peer-reviewed medical journal which covers research relating to the etiology and treatment of schizophrenia. The journal is published bimonthly by Oxford University Press in association with the Maryland Psychiatric Research Center and Schizophrenia International Research Society.

According to the Journal Citation Reports, the journal's 2020 impact factor is 9.306. The front cover of the journal traditionally depicts a work of art by a person with a mental disorder.

The founder and first editor-in-chief of  Schizophrenia Bulletin was American psychiatrist Loren Mosher.

See also 
 Schizophrenia Research
 List of psychiatry journals

References

External links 
 

English-language journals
Psychiatry journals
Publications with year of establishment missing
Bimonthly journals
Oxford University Press academic journals
Publications established in 1969
Academic journals associated with universities and colleges of the United States
Academic journals associated with learned and professional societies